Naccache is a suburban area located on the northern edge of Beirut, Lebanon. "It is located on Mount Lebanon and is administered by the municipality of Antelias. It also the headquarters of
Murr Television and Studio.

Geography
It is located directly beneath Rabieh. It consists of mostly pine trees. It also overlooks the Mediterranean Sea and the American embassy.

Neighbourhoods of Beirut
Populated places in the Matn District
Maronite Christian communities in Lebanon